Mysore–Bangalore line (officially Mysuru–Bengaluru line) is a fully electrified double line from  to .

Background 

Construction 
Since the rail network in British India was entirely private affairs. The erstwhile Kingdom of Mysore established Mysore State Railway for improving rail connectivity, right after the commissioning of Madras Royapuram–Bangalore City railway line in 1879. Though managing Mysore State Railway was an expensive affair, Chamarajendra Wadiyar X decided to lay a new rail from Bangalore to Mysore in 1870, and shelved the project soon. Again he dusted the  project and initiated the construction in 1877–1878. The  stretch between Bangalore–Channapatna was completed on 1 February 1881, the  Channapatna–Mandya stretch on 20 March 1881 and the final  Mandya–Mysore stretch was completed and the entire stretch thrown open to traffic on 25 February 1882.

The project to convert the Bangalore–Mysore metre gauge to broad gauge is approved in 1979–80.

Development
As only the  – stretch been completed, the work for the rest of line is in progress. The electrification of the line had been completed and was inaugurated by Prime Minister Narendra Modi on 20 February  2018.

References

Mysore railway division
5 ft 6 in gauge railways in India
Railway lines opened in 1882
Bangalore railway division
Transport in Mysore
Transport in Bangalore